Route 85 is a short highway in Gentry County.

Route description
Its northern terminus is at Business U.S. Route 136 in Albany; its southern terminus is at Evona where the highway becomes Route A.  No other towns are on the route.

History

Major intersections
The entire route is in Gentry County

References 

085
Transportation in Gentry County, Missouri